State Route 125 (SR 125) is a  state highway that runs south-to-north in an S-shape through the southern part of the U.S. state of Georgia. It travels through Lowndes, Lanier, Berrien, Tift, Irwin, and Ben Hill counties connecting the Valdosta and Fitzgerald metropolitan areas.

Route description
SR 125 begins at an intersection with U.S. Route 41 (US 41) and SR 7 (Inner Perimeter Road) on the north side of Valdosta. The route runs north-northeast, past Freedom Park and passes through Moody Air Force Base and intersects SR 122 at the meeting point of Lowndes, Berrien, and Lanier counties. It travels to the north along the Berrien–Lanier county line and then jogs slightly to the northeast, entering Lanier County proper. In Berrien County, it curves to the north-northwest before entering Ray City. Here, it meets US 129/SR 11/SR 37 (Main Street). At this intersection, US 129/SR 11 begin a concurrency. The three highways head north-northwest to Nashville. In town, SR 76 (Adel Highway) joins the concurrency through Nashville. In the central part of town, the four concurrent routes intersect SR 168 (East McPherson Avenue). Just after that SR 76 departs to the east on East Marion Avenue, while SR 125 departs to the west on West Marion Avenue. It heads northwest through rural areas of the county and enters Tift County.

In Tift County, it intersects US 41/SR 7 next to the Henry Tift Myers Airport, just southeast of Unionville. US 41/SR 7/SR 125 head concurrent to the north. In Tifton, the highway meets US 82/US 319/SR 35/SR 520 (East 5th Street). Farther into town, SR 125 splits off to the northeast and enters Irwin County. It runs northeast until it joins SR 32 (Sycamore Highway). They run concurrent to the northeast, through Irwinville, and to the east-southeast until SR 32 (Mystic Highway) splits off to the southeast. SR 125 curves to the northeast and continues in that direction until it meets its northern terminus, an intersection with SR 107 (Benjamin H. Hill Drive West), at the southwestern edge of Fitzgerald.

The only part of SR 125 that is part of the National Highway System, a system of roadways important to the nation's economy, defense, and mobility, is the section from the US 82/US 319/SR 35/SR 520 intersection in Tifton north to Fitzgerald.

Major intersections

See also

References

External links

 
 Georgia Roads (Routes 121 - 140)

125
Transportation in Lowndes County, Georgia
Transportation in Lanier County, Georgia
Transportation in Berrien County, Georgia
Transportation in Tift County, Georgia
Transportation in Irwin County, Georgia
Transportation in Ben Hill County, Georgia